The narrow-faced kangaroo rat (Dipodomys venustus) is a species of rodent in the family Heteromyidae. It is endemic to California in the United States.

Narrow-faced kangaroo rats lives within chaparral, mixed chaparral, and on sandy soils with oak or pine. They are distributed along West-central California in the coastal mountains.

References

Dipodomys
Endemic fauna of California
Mammals of the United States
Rodents of North America
Fauna of the California chaparral and woodlands
Fauna of the San Francisco Bay Area
Natural history of the California Coast Ranges
Mammals described in 1904
Taxonomy articles created by Polbot